Antonijs is a given name. Notable people with the name include:

Antonijs Černomordijs (born 1996), Latvian footballer
Antonijs Springovičs (1876–1958), Roman Catholic Latvian bishop

See also

Antonis
Antonija
Antonije
Antonijo